Wilson Meneses (born 3 July 1981) is a Colombian cyclist. He competed in the men's track time trial at the 2004 Summer Olympics.

References

External links
 

1981 births
Living people
Colombian male cyclists
Olympic cyclists of Colombia
Cyclists at the 2004 Summer Olympics
Place of birth missing (living people)
Competitors at the 2002 Central American and Caribbean Games
Competitors at the 2006 Central American and Caribbean Games